Bord Khun; also Romanized as Bord Khūn; also known as Bord Khūn-e Now and Bardeh Khān-i-Nau (بردخون نو), meaning ("New Bord Khun") is a city in Bord Khun District of Deyr County, Bushehr province, Iran. At the 2006 census, its population was 4,300 in 931 households. The following census in 2011 counted 4,376 people in 1,114 households. The latest census in 2016 showed a population of 5,333 people in 1,466 households.

References 

Cities in Bushehr Province
Populated places in Deyr County